Bank of Syria and Overseas is one of the first private banks established in Syria. It started operations in January 2004. BSO belongs to BLOM Bank Group.

Banks of Syria
Banks established in 2004
Companies based in Damascus